The Sánchez Carrión Province is one of twelve provinces of the La Libertad Region in Peru. It is named in honour of José Faustino Sánchez Carrión. The capital of this province is the city of Huamachuco. About 30 miles away is Marcahuamachuco, a prehistoric political and religious centre of a culture that throve AD 350-1100.

Political division

The province is divided into eight districts, which are:
 Chugay
 Cochorco
 Curgos
 Huamachuco
 Marcabal
 Sanagorán
 Sarín
 Sartimbamba

References

Provinces of the La Libertad Region